This is a list of Notre Dame Fighting Irish football players in the NFL.

Key

Selections

Notable undrafted players
Note: No drafts held before 1936

References

Notre Dame

Notre Dame Fighting Irish NFL Draft